Guarinisuchus is an extinct genus of marine crocodyliform from the Early Paleocene 62 million years ago of the Maria Farinha Formation, Brazil. The type species is G. munizi. Guarinisuchus appears to be closely related to marine crocodylomorphs found in Africa, which supports the hypothesis that the group originated in Africa and migrated to South America before spreading into the waters off the North American coast.

References

Further reading 
 
 National Geographic
 FOX News

Dyrosaurids
Prehistoric pseudosuchian genera
Prehistoric marine crocodylomorphs
Paleocene crocodylomorphs
Paleocene reptiles of South America
Tiupampan
Peligran
Paleogene Brazil
Fossils of Brazil
Fossil taxa described in 2008
Taxa named by Alexander Kellner